Kurortny District is a district of the federal city of St. Petersburg, Russia, located on the Karelian Isthmus along the northern shore of the Gulf of Finland. As of the 2010 Census, its population: was 70,589; up from 67,511 recorded in the 2002 Census.

Municipal divisions
Kurortny District comprises two municipal towns (Sestroretsk and Zelenogorsk) and nine municipal settlements (Beloostrov, Komarovo, Molodyozhnoye, Pesochny, Repino, Serovo, Smolyachkovo, Solnechnoye, and Ushkovo).

Tourism
Tourism in the district is driven by Finnish bus tours. The current hotel stock is predominantly economy class, with a few four star hotels. Plans to develop the region's hotel stock are coming to fruition, but the area lacks strong tourist demand.

Health
A large hospital and rehabilitation center is situated in Sestroretsk.

References

Notes

Sources

 
Karelian Isthmus